Do Matwale is a 1991 Indian Bollywood action film directed by Ajay Kashyap and produced by Pushpa S. Choudhary. It stars Sanjay Dutt, Chunky Pandey, Sonam and Shilpa Shirodkar in pivotal roles.

Synopsis

Amar (Chunky Pandey) comes to the city for his mother's (Sushma Seth) medical treatment. He robbed by a local goon on medical store. Fortunately, a young man Ajay (Sanjay Dutt) helps him. They became friends. Then one day Amar attempts to prevent Ajay from committing a robbery only to get Ajay arrested by the police. Ajay swears to avenge this. Later Amar forced to enter crime world to arrange money for his mother's operation. 

Ajay gets released from jail, now his only motive is to take revenge. Ajay got shocked to know that his sister Doctor Pooja is in love with Amar. Ajay threatens Amar to stay away from Pooja. The couple elope and get married. Pooja got brutally raped and murdered by Kasturi and Pyaremohan. Now Amar and Ajay's only motive to take revenge.

Cast
 Sanjay Dutt as Ajay
 Chunky Pandey as Amar 
 Sonam as Sonu
 Shilpa Shirodkar as Dr. Pooja
 Kader Khan as Gorakh Nath
 Gulshan Grover as Pyaremohan
 Anjana Mumtaz as Sarita G. Nath
 Sushma Seth as Amar's mother
 Shakti Kapoor as Sampath (ward boy) / Champath / Ganpath
 Preeti Sapru
 Gurbachan Singh
 Kiran Kumar as Kasturi
 Viju Khote

Soundtrack

External links

1990s Hindi-language films
1991 films
Films scored by Laxmikant–Pyarelal
Films directed by Ajay Kashyap